Everybody Dance (also known as DanceStar Party in Europe) is a 2011 competitive dance game developed by London Studio and published by Sony Computer Entertainment. It is a spin-off of the game SingStar Dance, which was also developed by London Studio. Like that game, this game utilizes the PlayStation Move controller for dancing.

A sequel, Everybody Dance 2 (DanceStar Party Hits in Europe) was released in 2012, and a second sequel, Everybody Dance 3, was released in 2013 exclusively in Latin America. That year, Sony Competitive Entertainment also released Everybody Dance Digital (DanceStar Digital in Europe), an otherwise free-to-play title which contained no pre-included songs; songs were instead purchased in Packs ("Mixes" in Europe) of four, much in the same manner as DLC songs in the three main games (there was also a Demo Pack which could be purchased for free).

Reception

Everybody Dance received mixed reviews from critics upon release. On Metacritic, the game holds a score of 66/100 based on 5 reviews.

References

External links
Official website
Song list

2011 video games
Dance video games
PlayStation 3 games
PlayStation 3-only games
PlayStation Move-compatible games
Sony Interactive Entertainment games
PlayStation Move-only games
Multiplayer and single-player video games
Video games developed in the United Kingdom
London Studio games